Tallahassee International Airport  is a city-owned airport five miles southwest of downtown Tallahassee, in Leon County, Florida, United States. It serves the state capital of Florida, and its surrounding areas; it is one of the major airports in north Florida, the others being Pensacola International Airport, Northwest Florida Beaches International Airport, and Jacksonville International Airport. Despite its name, it does not yet service any international destinations.

History

The airport began as Tallahassee Municipal Airport with a ceremony on April 23, 1961. The flag of the United States was presented to the City of Tallahassee by Captain Eddie Rickenbacker, World War I fighter ace and Chairman of the Board of Eastern Airlines. An aerial demonstration was performed by U.S. Army aircraft from Fort Rucker, Alabama. Tallahassee Municipal replaced the city's first airport, Dale Mabry Field, which closed that year.

Eastern Airlines opened the airport by ferrying city, state and chamber of commerce officials. Aboard the flight were Tallahassee Mayor Joe Cordell, State Comptroller Ray Green, Tallahassee City Commissioners Davis Atkinson, George Taff, Hugh Williams, Tallahassee City Manager Arvah Hopkins, Tallahassee City Clerk-Auditor George White, Airport Manager Flagg Chittenden, and Ernest Menendez, Frank Deller, James Calhoun, John Ward and Jeff Lewis, all of the Tallahassee-Leon County Chamber of Commerce.

In June 1961, less than two months after it opened, the airport was the site of Freedom Rider protests.  The airport restaurant, Savarin, was designated "Whites Only" and closed rather than serve a racially-mixed group of clergy and activists. The protestors were arrested and removed, and later served prison sentences after the Supreme Court rejected their case in Dresner vs City of Tallahassee on a technicality.

From the airport's opening until the early 1980s, the airport's primary runway was Runway 18/36, a 6,076-foot runway with an ILS approach, enabling all-weather approaches, and a USAF certified High TACAN approach for practice by Air Force aircraft based at Tyndall AFB, near Panama City. Runway 09/27 was 4,000 feet long and supported general aviation operations. By the 1970s, the airport had scheduled flights on Eastern Airlines, Delta Air Lines, National Airlines and Southern Airways, mainly on Boeing 727s, Boeing 737s and McDonnell Douglas DC-9s.

By the 1980s the terminal was becoming obsolete, and the 6,100 foot runway was too short for the Boeing 757 and Boeing 767 coming into service. Runway 09/27 was converted to a taxiway and a new Runway 09/27, 8,003 feet long with ILS, was built just to the south. A new passenger terminal was built just north of the new runway.  On December 3, 1989, the city opened the $33 million terminal, and on February 20, 2000, the terminal was renamed the Ivan Munroe Terminal in honor of Tallahassee aviation pioneer Ivan Munroe. Munroe was the first man in Tallahassee to own a plane.

On July 20, 2002, FedEx Express Flight 1478 crashed a half mile short of the Runway 9 while attempting to land. The National Transportation Safety Board determined that the crash was due to a combination of pilot fatigue and pilot error. All three crewmembers survived.

On June 26, 2015, Tallahassee Regional Airport was renamed Tallahassee International Airport. On June 29, 2015 the City of Tallahassee and the FAA announced the name change. International passengers are allowed to exit the airport via Tallahassee International Airport due to the facility's full-service "service port" for U.S. Customs. The change allows international cargo and general aviation flights to directly come to Tallahassee, which is the leading cargo handler in the Panhandle area of Florida. Tallahassee handles 9.5 million pounds of cargo a year, more than the next city, Pensacola, which handles around 6.8 million pounds.

On January 27, 2021, the airport was struck by an EF0 tornado, causing minor damage and temporary closure to assess the damage. A small plane was flipped and minor damage was done to a hangar. No injuries were reported.

Facilities
It has two runways: 09/27 is 8,000 by 150 feet (2,438 by 46 m) and 18/36 is 7,000 by 150 ft. (2,134 by 46 m). Helicopter operations are generally confined to the Runway 18/36 area, or direct approaches to the Million Air FBO ramp area.

In the year ending March 31, 2019, the airport had 74,004 aircraft operations, average 203 per day: 52% general aviation, 13% air taxi, 23% military and 12% airline. 98 aircraft were then based at this airport: 70 single-engine, 9 multi-engine, 7 jet and 12 helicopter.

The terminal has two concourses, A & B. Delta Air Lines utilizes Gates B1 and B3, American Airlines uses Gates A1, A3, and A5. Silver Airways utilizes Gate A4. United Airlines utilized Gate B6 when it offered United Express flights to  Houston-Bush Intercontinental Airport which was discontinued on October 1, 2021.

Airlines and destinations

Passenger

Destinations map

Cargo

Statistics

Top destinations

Incidents 

 On October 20, 1956, a Lockheed 18-50 Lodestar (N33368) of National Airlines landed too far down the runway while it was wet, ground-looped, and went through a ditch into some trees. The aircraft was damaged beyond repair.
 On July 26, 2002, a Boeing 727-232F (N497FE) operating as FedEx Express Flight 1478 from Memphis was landing when the plane struck trees 3,650 feet short of the runway and hit the ground 1,000 feet later, slid an additional 1,100 feet through an open field, and came to rest 1,000 feet from the runway after hitting construction vehicles and burned out. Crash was found to be caused by crew fatigue; none of the 3 on board were killed.

See also

 Florida World War II Army Airfields

References

External links
 Tallahassee International Airport, official site
 http://www.flytallahassee.com/ Flight Instruction in TLH
 Eagle Aircraft
 
 

Transportation in Tallahassee, Florida
Airports in Florida
Transportation buildings and structures in Leon County, Florida
1961 establishments in Florida
Airports established in 1961